Carlos Valdovinos Valdovinos (born 19 December 1899−14 March 1966) is a Chilean politician and lawyer who served as bi-minister during Pedro Aguirre Cerda's government.

In his country, he is commonly known to have an avenue and a metro station with his name. In the other hand, Valdovinos was a transversal politician in his time, which is supported by the tributes he received from the then-marxist deputy Mario Palestro, from the Socialist Party, as well as from politicians linked to the Liberal Party and the Conservative Party.

See also
 Carlos Valdovinos metro station

References

External links
 BCN Profile

1889 births
1966 deaths
20th-century Chilean lawyers
University of Chile alumni
Radical Party of Chile politicians